The Tonopah Mining Company Cottage is a historic house located on Queen Street in Tonopah, Nevada. Built in 1902, the home is one of the oldest frame houses in Tonopah. The house was constructed by the Tonopah Mining Company, the largest silver mining company in Tonopah. The cottage was the second home built for the company's employees and the oldest of the three surviving company houses built by the company.

The house was added to the National Register of Historic Places on May 20, 1982.

References

External links
Tonopah Mining Company of Nevada records at Hagley Museum and Library

Houses on the National Register of Historic Places in Nevada
Houses completed in 1902
National Register of Historic Places in Tonopah, Nevada
Houses in Nye County, Nevada